Anil Kumar Mann (born 11 December 1980) is an Indian wrestler who was a silver medallist at the 2002 Commonwealth Games in the men's freestyle 96 kg event. In 2013 Mann was presented the Dhyan Chand Award.

References 

Indian male sport wrestlers
Living people
Wrestlers at the 2002 Commonwealth Games
Commonwealth Games gold medallists for India
1980 births
Commonwealth Games silver medallists for India
Commonwealth Games medallists in wrestling
Recipients of the Dhyan Chand Award
Wrestlers at the 2002 Asian Games
Medallists at the 2002 Commonwealth Games